Beacon Hill Academy (formerly Beacon Hill School) is a coeducational special school with academy status located in South Ockendon, Essex, England.

The school is for students with profound and severe learning difficulties.

References

External links
Beacon Hill Academy official website

Special schools in Thurrock
Academies in Thurrock